Luritja Road is a designated state route in the Northern Territory of Australia. Strictly touristic, it runs through the Watarrka National Park. It is part of the Red Centre Way and connects Larapinta Drive with the Lasseter Highway. The road is named after the Aboriginal Luritja tribe.

See also

References

Roads in the Northern Territory